U.S. Route 13 (US 13) is a U.S. Highway running from Eastover, North Carolina to Morrisville, Pennsylvania. In North Carolina runs along a northeast–southwest alignment for  connecting the cities of Fayetteville, Goldsboro, Greenville, Williamston, and Ahoskie. The southern terminus is located at Interstate 95 (I-95) and I-295 near Eastover. From the terminus, US 13 travels along a northeastern-southwestern alignment through Newton Grove to US 117 in Mar-Mac. US 13 runs concurrently along US 117 north to Goldsboro, where it also shares a brief concurrency with US 70. The highway continues northeastward to Greenville and then turns to the north until reaching US 64 near Bethel. US 13 and US 64 run concurrently to the east until Williamston where US 13 diverges to the north, concurrent with US 17. In Windsor, US 13 diverges from US 17 and runs northward through Ahoskie. US 13 turns to the northeast near Winton and continues in that direction until reaching the Virginia state line near Gates, North Carolina.

In the 1925 plan for the United States Numbered Highway System, US 13 was to enter North Carolina south of Norfolk, Virginia and continue southward to Wilmington, North Carolina. However, the finalized 1926 plan moved the southern terminus of US 13 to Norfolk while US 17 was assigned the corridor to Wilmington. In 1952, US 13 was extended south of Norfolk to Windsor, entering North Carolina at its modern-day location. US 13 was extended south to US 70 and US 117 in Goldsboro in 1957 and to I-95 near Eastover in 1963. Since 1963, US 13 has undergone some minor realignments and widening along its route but the corridor has remained the same.

Route description

Interstate 95 to Newton Grove
US 13 begins at a hybrid interchange incorporating elements of a cloverleaf, a directional-T, and a diamond, consisting of a junction with Interstate 95 (exit 58) and Interstate 295 (Fayetteville Outer Loop) near Fayetteville in Cumberland County.  It quickly reduces its lane count from the four of the I-295 freeway to two lanes with dirt shoulders.  It bears eastward, passing through sparsely developed forest and farm lands, quickly crossing the county border and entering Sampson County.  The route turns slightly northeast and passes through Spivey's Corner, where the road intersects US 421, otherwise known as Spivey's Corner Highway.

Nearing Newton Grove, US 13 passes over Interstate 40 with no direct access.  The route then enters the small town and is interrupted by a large roundabout which brings three routes—itself; North Carolina Highway 50, Raleigh Street west and Mount Olive Drive east; and US 701, Main Street north and Clinton Street south—to a central point in the city.

Newton Grove to Goldsboro
Continuing north from Newton Grove, US 13 enters Wayne County, traveling more easterly through more farmland and forests.  After several miles, it curves northeast and meets US 117 at an intersection.  Here, it turns north on the four-lane, divided highway and begins to travel around the west side of Goldsboro, the beginning of a partial beltway around the city.  Before turning east again, US 13 leaves US 117 at an at-grade intersection, the latter of which upgrades into a freeway.  US 117 Bypass travels along with US 13.

US 13 circles around the city on a four-lane, divided freeway alignment after another at-grade intersection, immediately interchanging with NC 581.  Shortly after, it meets US 70 at a partial cloverleaf interchange, and US 70 joins the other two routes on its path east.  The next interchange sends US 117 Alternate north at a partial trumpet interchange; US 117 continues north to the east of its parent until they both intersect US 264.  US 13 and US 70 continue east, next interchanging NC 111.  The road interchanges Wayne Memorial Drive and Spence Avenue before curving southward.  The freeway then interchanges with Berkeley Boulevard, where US 13 leaves.  US 70 continues on the freeway, while US 13 turns northeast on Berkeley Boulevard, leaving the Goldsboro area.

Goldsboro to US 64
US 13 continues northeast, passing through one last community of Goldsboro before entering open fields and forests once again and entering Greene County.  Outside Snow Hill, NC 58 joins US 13 and becomes Kingold Boulevard.  US 13 leaves Kingold Boulevard once in the center of town, continuing northeast via Contentnea Boulevard.

Contentnea Boulevard outside the city meets an intersection with US 258 and NC 903, which join US 13.  The other side of the four-way intersection continues as NC 91.  NC 903 leaves after two curves of the road, leaving US 13 and 258 to continue northeast through farmland.  US 13 leaves US 258 after a stretch, turning east to meet and run concurrent with US 264, Dickinson Avenue.  This arrangement continues until Greenville, where US 264 leaves, and US 13 bisects the city on Memorial Drive, forming concurrencies with NC 43, NC 903 and NC 11.  The concurrency eventually drops NC 43, and later picks up NC 33 and drops it, also dropping NC 903 before it heads northward.  Still a four-lane divided road, it bypasses the town of Bethel before it meets a diamond interchange with the US 64 freeway in the corner of Edgecombe County.  US 13 turns east onto this freeway, while NC 11 continues northward.

US 64 to Virginia
US 13 and US 64 travel eastward to Williamston.  The roadway curves around the south and east sides of the city, where US 17 joins and US 64 leaves.  US 13/17 continue north on a four lane alignment until Williamston, where it bypasses the town to the west.  On the north side, though, US 13 leaves at an interchange on North King Street, traveling north on a two-lane road, while US 17 carries the freeway east towards the ocean.

The road continues through the farm and forest medium until it enters Ahoskie on city streets, forming concurrencies with NC 42 and NC 561.  These leave in the city before US 13 exits, finally crossing into Gates County along with US 158.  The concurrency travels for a few miles, the roads separating before the Virginia state border.  Here, US 13 continues into Virginia as Whaleyville Boulevard.

Scenic byways
Blue-Gray Scenic Byway is an  byway from Four Oaks to Trenton. US 13 overlap a short  section of the byway, from Bentonville Road to Grantham School Road, northeast of Newton Grove.  The byway is noted for its Civil War history.

US 13 and US 13 Business together form a short  section of the loop, in Windsor. The byway is noted for historical homes in Edenton, the Sans Souci Ferry, the scenic river and coastal views, and history.

Lafayette's Tour is an  byway from Halifax to Lynch's Corner, in the Great Dismal Swamp. US 13 overlap a short  section of the byway; from US 258, near Winton, to NC 137.  The byway is noted and named after the French General Marquis de Lafayette, who visited the area in 1825.  It is also noted for the Parker Island Cable Ferry, swamps/bogs, and history.

History
Established in 1952, US 13 came south from Virginia; replacing NC 97 from the state line to Windsor, ending at US 17 (now NC 308).

Around 1956, US 13 was extended south to Goldsboro; following: US 17 to Williamston, US 64 to Bethel, NC 11 to Greenville, US 264 to Farmville, US 258 to Snow Hill, NC 102 to Goldsboro.  Following west on US 70, it ended at the US 117 interchange.

In 1957, Windsor was bypassed, creating US 13 Business following the old downtown route.  By 1960, US 13 was extended southwest again, replacing NC 102, to its current southern terminus at Interstate 95.  In 1970, US 13 moved onto cutoff road between US 258 and US 264, removing Farmville completely from the route.  In 1974, Winton was bypassed, the old alignment became part of NC 45 and NC 461.

By 2000, US 13 was placed on new freeway from Bethel to Robersonville, with US 64; the old alignment became US 64 Alternate.  In 2002, it was extended to Williamston.  In 2004, Bethel was bypassed, creating US 13 Business following the old main street route.

Junction list

See also
 Special routes of U.S. Route 13
 North Carolina Bicycle Route 4 - Concurrent with US 13 from Winton to Eure

References

External links

13
 North Carolina
Transportation in Cumberland County, North Carolina
Transportation in Sampson County, North Carolina
Transportation in Wayne County, North Carolina
Transportation in Greene County, North Carolina
Transportation in Pitt County, North Carolina
Transportation in Edgecombe County, North Carolina
Transportation in Martin County, North Carolina
Transportation in Bertie County, North Carolina
Transportation in Hertford County, North Carolina
Transportation in Gates County, North Carolina
Historic Albemarle Tour